Thursday's Child is a 1943 British comedy-drama film directed by Rodney Ackland and starring Sally Ann Howes and Wilfrid Lawson. It was produced by John Argyle and Associated British Picture Corporation.

Synopsis
A young girl, Fennis Wilson (Sally Ann Howes), is cast in a film which launches her career and makes her an overnight star – the very thing her older sister desperately wants.

But stardom is the furthest thing from 12-year-old Fennis' mind; she is introspective and intellectual and has other goals for her life.  When the hit film falls in her lap, it creates a situation that threatens to tear the family apart, while Fennis just wants everyone to be happy – especially herself. Ronald Shiner's character (Joe) plays a decisive role

Casting
Thursday's Child was the first film for Howes. It was written and directed by Rodney Ackland, who was a neighbor of hers. Howes auditioned and was chosen for the part after over two hundred auditions of other girls.

Cast
 Sally Ann Howes as Fennis Wilson
 Wilfrid Lawson as Frank Wilson
 Kathleen O'Regan as Ellen Wilson
 Stewart Granger as David Penley
 Eileen Bennett as Phoebe Wilson
 Marianne Davis as Gloria Dewey
 Gerhard Kempinski as Rudi Kauffmann
 Felix Aylmer as Mr. Keith
 Margaret Yarde as Mrs. Chard
 Vera Bogetti as Madame Felicia
 Percy Walsh as Charles Lennox
 Michael Allen as Jim Wilson
 Margaret Drummond as Wendy Keith
 Ronald Shiner as Joe
 Anthony Holles as Roy Todd

References

External links
 
 
 

1943 films
1943 comedy-drama films
British black-and-white films
British comedy-drama films
Films set in London
Films about filmmaking
Films shot at Welwyn Studios
1940s English-language films
1940s British films